The Evergreen series is a family of GPUs developed by Advanced Micro Devices for its Radeon line under the ATI brand name.  It was employed in Radeon HD 5000 graphics card series and competed directly with Nvidia's GeForce 400 Series.

Release
The existence was spotted on a presentation slide from AMD Technology Analyst Day July 2007 as "R8xx". AMD held a press event in the USS Hornet Museum on September 10, 2009 and announced ATI Eyefinity multi-display technology and specifications of the Radeon HD 5800 series' variants. The first variants of the Radeon HD 5800 series were launched September 23, 2009, with the HD 5700 series launching October 12 and HD 5970 launching on November 18 The HD 5670, was launched on January 14, 2010, and the HD 5500 and 5400 series were launched in February 2010, completing what has appeared to be most of AMD's Evergreen GPU lineup.

Demand so greatly outweighed supply that more than two months after launch, many online retailers were still having trouble keeping the 5800 and 5900 series in stock.

Architecture
This article is about all products under the Radeon HD 5000 Series brand. TeraScale 2 was introduced with this.
Radeon HD 5830 and above products，have the capability to calculate double-precision floating-point format.
Radeon HD 5770 and below products，have the capability to calculate only single-precision floating-point format.
OpenGL 4.x compliance requires supporting FP64 shaders. These are implemented by emulation on some TeraScale (microarchitecture) GPUs.

Multi-monitor support

The on-die display controllers with the new brand name ATI Eyefinity were introduced with the Radeon HD 5000 Series. The entire HD 5000 series products have Eyefinity capabilities supporting three outputs.  The Radeon HD 5870 Eyefinity Edition, however, supports six mini DisplayPort outputs, all of which can be simultaneously active.

Display pipeline supports xvYCC gamut and 12-bit per component output via HDMI. HDMI 1.3a output. The previous generation Radeon R700 GPUs in the Radeon HD 4000 Series only support up to LPCM 7.1 audio and no bitstream output support for Dolby TrueHD and DTS-HD Master Audio audio formats to external decoders. This feature is now supported on Evergreen family GPUs. On Evergreen family GPUs, DisplayPort outputs on board are capable of 10-bit per component output, and HDMI output is capable of 12-bit per component output.

Video acceleration
Unified Video Decoder (UVD2.2) is present on the dies of all products and supported by AMD Catalyst 9.11 and later through DXVA 2.0 on Microsoft Windows and VDPAU on Linux and FreeBSD. The free and open-source graphics device driver#ATI/AMD also support UVD.

OpenCL (API) 

OpenCL accelerates many scientific software packages up to a factor 10 or 100 and more, compared to contemporary CPUs.
OpenCL 1.0 to 1.2 are supported for all TeraScale 2 and 3 chips.

Radeon Feature Table

Desktop products

Radeon HD 5900

Codenamed Hemlock, the Radeon HD 5900 series was announced on October 12, 2009, starting with the HD 5970. The Radeon HD 5900 series utilizes two Cypress graphics processors and a third-party PCI-E bridge. Similar to Radeon HD 4800 X2 series graphics cards; however, AMD has abandoned the use of X2 moniker for dual-GPU variants starting with Radeon HD 5900 series, making it the only series within the Evergreen GPU family to have two GPUs on one PCB.

Radeon HD 5800 

Codenamed Cypress, the Radeon HD 5800 series was announced on September 23, 2009. Products included Radeon HD 5850 and Radeon HD 5870. The launching model of Radeon HD 5870 can support three display outputs at most, and one of these has to support DisplayPort. In terms of overall performance, the 5870 comes in between the GTX 470 and GTX 480 from rival company Nvidia, being closer to the GTX 480 than the GTX 470. An Eyefinity 6 edition of Radeon HD 5870 was released, with 2 GiB GDDR5 memory, supporting six simultaneous displays, all to be connected to one of the mini DisplayPort outputs and all supporting this connection natively to not require additional hardware. The Radeon HD 5870 has 1600 usable shader processors, while the Radeon HD 5850 has 1,440 usable stream cores, as 160 out of the 1,600 total cores are disabled during product binning which detects potentially defective areas of the chip. A Radeon HD 5830 was released on February 25, 2010. The Radeon HD 5830 has 1,120 usable stream cores and a standard core clock of 800 MHz.

Radeon HD 5700
The codename for the 5700 GPU was Juniper and it was exactly half of Cypress. Half the shader engines, half the memory controllers, half the ROPs, half the TMUs, half everything. The 5750 had one shader engine disabled (of 10), so had 720 stream processors, while the 5770 had all ten enabled. Additionally, the 5750 ran at 700 MHz and a lower voltage, while the 5770 used more power, but ran at 850 MHz. Both cards were normally found with 1 GB of GDDR5 memory, but 512 MB variants did exist, performance suffering somewhat.

Radeon HD 5600

Codenamed Redwood XT, the 5600 series has all five of Redwood's shader engines enabled. As each of them has 80 VLIW-5 units, this gave it 400 stream processors. Reference clocks were 775 MHz for all 5600s, while memory clocks varied between OEMs, as did the use of DDR3 and GDDR5 memory, the latter being twice as fast.

Radeon HD 5500

The Radeon HD 5570 was released on February 9, 2010, using the Redwood XT GPU as seen in the 5600 series. At first release was limited to DDR3 memory, but later, ATI added support for GDDR5 memory. One more variant, with only 320 stream cores, is available and Radeon HD 5550 was suggested as the product name.  5570s and 5550s were available with GDDR5, GDDR3 and DDR2 memory. The 5550 variant disabled one shader engine, so had only 320 stream processors (4 engines, 80 VLIW-5 units each).

All reference board designs of the Radeon HD 5500 series are half-height, making them suitable for a low profile form factor chassis.

Radeon HD 5400 

Codenamed Cedar, the Radeon HD 5400 series was announced on February 4, 2010, starting with the HD 5450. The Radeon HD 5450 has 80 stream cores, a core clock of 650 MHz, and 800 MHz DDR2 or DDR3 memory. The 5400 series is designed to assume a low-profile card size.

Mobile products

Graphics device drivers

AMD's proprietary graphics device driver "Catalyst" 

AMD Catalyst is being developed for Microsoft Windows and Linux. As of July 2014, other operating systems are not officially supported. This may be different for the AMD FirePro brand, which is based on identical hardware but features OpenGL-certified graphics device drivers.

AMD Catalyst supports of course all features advertised for the Radeon brand.

Free and open-source graphics device driver "Radeon" 

The free and open-source drivers are primarily developed on Linux and for Linux, but have been ported to other operating systems as well. On HD5000, the driver using following six parts:

 Linux kernel component DRM
 Linux kernel component KMS driver: basically the device driver for the display controller in kernel, called "radeon".
 user-space component libDRM: basically one of 3d drivers. The HD5000 series are using the "r600g" driver.
 user-space component in Mesa 3D;
 a special and distinct 2D graphics device driver for X.Org Server; with this card, EXA is used instead of Glamor

The free and open-source "Radeon" graphics driver supports most of the features implemented into the Radeon line of GPUs.

The free and open-source "Radeon" graphics device drivers are not reverse engineered, but based on documentation released by AMD.

See also 
 AMD FirePro
 AMD FireMV
 AMD FireStream
 List of AMD graphics processing units

References

External links
 ATI Radeon HD 5000 Series graphics
 techPowerUp! GPU Database

Laptop products 
 ATI Mobility Radeon HD 5400 Series
 ATI Mobility Radeon HD 5700 & HD 5600 Series
 ATI Mobility Radeon HD 5800 Series 
 AMD Radeon HD 6300M Series Graphics
 AMD Radeon HD 6500M Series Graphics
 AMD Radeon HD 6800M Series Graphics

AMD graphics cards under ATI brand
Computer-related introductions in 2009
Graphics cards